Charles Newirth (born August 22, 1955) is an American film producer.

Newirth most recently executive produced the blockbuster films Shang-Chi and the Legend of the Ten Rings (2021), Ant-Man and the Wasp (2018), Dr. Strange (2016) and Iron Man 3 (2013), for Marvel Studios and Disney.

Prior to that, Newirth had joined Revolution Studios in May 2000 and was responsible for overseeing the physical production of all Revolution Studios' motion pictures. He continued with Revolution Studios until June 2007, when he returned to working as an independent producer.

Revolution Studios released 47 films, including America's Sweethearts (2001), Black Hawk Down (2001), XXX (2002), Anger Management (2003), Daddy Day Care (2003), Mona Lisa Smile (2003), Hellboy (2004), 13 Going on 30 (2004) and Rocky Balboa (2006). At Revolution Studios, Newirth served as executive producer on The Water Horse: Legend of the Deep (2007), Across the Universe (2007), Freedomland (2006), Christmas with the Kranks (2004), Peter Pan (2003), Maid in Manhattan (2002), The One (2001) and America's Sweethearts (2001).

Before joining Revolution Studios, Newirth produced the popular Robin Williams hit Patch Adams (1998), Home Fries (1998) starring Drew Barrymore, and the sleeper hit Galaxy Quest (1999), starring Tim Allen, Sigourney Weaver and Alan Rickman.

Newirth co-produced Robert Zemeckis' multiple Academy Award-winning blockbuster Forrest Gump (1994). His other executive producing credits include: Zookeeper (2011) ; Brad Silberling's City of Angels (1998) starring Nicolas Cage and Meg Ryan; Rob Reiner's true-life drama Ghosts of Mississippi (1996) with Alec Baldwin, Whoopi Goldberg and James Woods; The American President (1995), also for director Rob Reiner, starring Michael Douglas and Annette Bening and Jon Turteltaub's Phenomenon (1996) starring John Travolta. He also served as a co-producer on the Barry Levinson films Toys (1992), the multiple Oscar-nominated Bugsy (1991) and as an associate producer on Barry Levinson's Avalon (1990).

Raised in Scarsdale, New York, Newirth received a BA in Photography and Cinema from Ohio State University. He broke into the film industry as a location manager on such films as Flashdance (1983), Pretty in Pink (1986) and Ferris Bueller's Day Off (1986). He later moved up to production manager on Throw Momma from the Train (1987) and RoboCop (1987) before getting his first producing credit as an associate producer on The Package (1989).

Filmography
He was a producer in all films unless otherwise noted.

Film

Production manager

Location management

Miscellaneous crew

Second unit director or assistant director

Thanks

Television

Thanks

References

External links
 

1955 births
Film producers from New York (state)
Living people
Businesspeople from New York City
People from Scarsdale, New York
Ohio State University alumni
Golden Globe Award-winning producers
Scarsdale High School alumni